Bois d'Arc   is an unincorporated community in Butler County, Kansas, United States.  It is located about six miles southeast of Augusta in Bloomington Township.

History

The name Bois d'Arc is taken from one of the names for a common tree in the area, the Osage Orange tree.  The Osage Indians used these trees to make their bows.

The post office was established December 21, 1892, and was discontinued March 31, 1904.

The nearby Little Walnut River Pratt Truss Bridge is on the National Register of Historic Places. According to the National Register of Historic Places registration form, the bridge crosses Little Walnut Creek, one mile below where Hickory Creek flows into it.  This is on SW 157th Terrace between SW Commanche Road and SW Purity Springs Road. The remains of a grist mill can be found upstream.

The name and spelling of the town was eventually corrupted to Boder. Later, the spelling of the town name changed to "Bodarc" reflecting its present-day pronunciation.

Remaining structures in Bois d'Arc comprise the former post office, a farmhouse, the bridge, and the ruins of the grist mill.

Education
The community is served by Bluestem USD 205 public school district.

See also
 National Register of Historic Places listings in Butler County, Kansas
 Little Walnut River Pratt Truss Bridge

References

Further reading

External links
 Photos of Bois D'Arc
 How a Kansas ghost town got its name, KSN 3 TV
 Butler County maps: Current, Historic, KDOT

Unincorporated communities in Butler County, Kansas
Unincorporated communities in Kansas
Wichita, KS Metropolitan Statistical Area
Populated places established in 1892